Lyudmyla and Nadiya Kichenok were the defending champions, having won the event in 2012, but Nadiya chose not to participate. Her sister Lyudmyla partnered up with Polina Pekhova as the first seeds.

Lyudmyla Kichenok and Pekhova won the title, defeating Michaela Hončová and Veronika Kapshay in the final, 6–4, 6–2.

Seeds

Draw

References 
 Draw

Fergana Challenger - Women's Doubles
2013 Women's Doubles